Saeed Jones (born November 26, 1985) is an American writer and poet. His debut collection Prelude to Bruise was named a 2014 finalist for the National Book Critics Circle Award for poetry. His second book, a memoir, How We Fight for Our Lives won the Kirkus Prize for Nonfiction in 2019.

Early life
Jones was born in Memphis, Tennessee and grew up in Lewisville, Texas. He attended college at Western Kentucky University, then earned an MFA in Creative Writing at Rutgers University–Newark.

Career

Poetry 
Jones released his debut poetry chapbook in 2011. Titled When the Only Light is Fire, it was the top-selling book in the Gay Poetry category on Amazon for several weeks.

In 2014, Jones published his first full-length poetry collection, Prelude to Bruise. NPR called it "brilliant, unsparing," "visceral and affecting." The Kenyon Review said the work "evokes a perilous, often mythic, eroticism within a brutalizing context of violence." TIME Magazine recommended it as "an engrossing read best consumed in as few sittings as possible." It was a 2014 finalist for the National Book Critics Circle Award for poetry.

In September 2022, Jones published another poetry collection, Alive at the End of the World.

Jones has been a winner of the Pushcart Prize, the Joyce Osterwell Award for Poetry from the PEN Literary Awards, and the Stonewall Book Award-Barbara Gittings Award for Literature, and a nominee for the 2014 Lambda Literary Award for Gay Poetry. Jones has been featured on PBS NewsHours poetry series and on So Popular! with Janet Mock on MSNBC. He was featured on the cover of Hello Mr. in 2015.

Prose and other projects 
Jones previously worked for BuzzFeed as the founding LGBT editor and its executive culture editor. While at BuzzFeed, Jones cohosted BuzzFeed New's morning show AM to DM from fall 2017 until mid-2019. Jones also wrote an advice column for BuzzFeed's READER newsletter entitled "Dear Ferocity."

His memoir How We Fight for Our Lives was published by Simon & Schuster in 2019. The New Yorker called the book's tone and content "urgent, immediate, matter of fact". NPR called it an "outstanding memoir" with "elements that profoundly connect him to poetry" and to "many of us who grew up dreaming of a chance at upward social mobility". The book won the Kirkus Prize for Nonfiction in 2019 and a Lambda Literary Award in 2020.

In 2022, Jones's interview with Debbie Millman was featured on the Storybound (podcast) season 5 premiere.

Jones is one of the hosts of the Vibe Check podcast.

Personal life 
Jones lives in Columbus, Ohio.

Jones was brought up to practice Nichiren Buddhism and still does today.

Bibliography

Poetry collections
When the Only Light is Fire. Sibling Rivalry Press, 2011.
Prelude to Bruise. Coffee House Press, 2014.

In Anthology
Ghost Fishing: An Eco-Justice Poetry Anthology. University of Georgia Press, 2018.

Memoir

References

External links
 

21st-century American poets
African-American poets
American advice columnists
American male poets
American gay writers
LGBT African Americans
American LGBT poets
Living people
People from Lewisville, Texas
Poets from New York (state)
Poets from Tennessee
Poets from Texas
Rutgers University alumni
Western Kentucky University alumni
Writers from Memphis, Tennessee
Writers from New York City
1985 births
21st-century American male writers
21st-century American non-fiction writers
American male non-fiction writers
Kirkus Prize winners
Lambda Literary Award winners
Stonewall Book Award winners
21st-century African-American writers
20th-century African-American people
Gay poets